Andranovao is a town and commune in western Madagascar. It belongs to the district of Maintirano, which is a part of Melaky Region. The population of the commune was estimated to be approximately 12,000 in 2001 commune census.

Only primary schooling is available. The majority 50% of the population of the commune are farmers, while an additional 40% receives their livelihood from raising livestock. The most important crops are rice and maize, while other important agricultural products are bananas, wheat and coconuts.  Services provide employment for 2% of the population. Additionally, fishing employs 8% of the population.

References and notes

External link 
 Satellite Images of Andranovao

Populated places in Melaky